Endeavour Piedmont Glacier is a piedmont glacier,  long and  wide, between the southwest part of Mount Bird and Micou Point, Ross Island. In association with the names of expedition ships grouped on this island, it was named after HMNZS Endeavour, a tanker/supply ship which for at least 10 seasons, 1962–63 to 1971–72, transported bulk petroleum products and cargo to Scott Base and McMurdo Station on Ross Island.

See also
 List of glaciers in the Antarctic
 Glaciology

References 

Glaciers of Ross Island